Viktoria Berghausen is a German association football club from the town of Berghausen, Baden-Württemberg.

History
Established in 1906 as FC Germania Berghausen the club quickly failed, but was reformed in July 1906 as Viktoria. They played their first match against Frankonia Durlach losing 6:0.

Through most of the 1960s the team was a lower-tier side in the Amateurliga Nordbaden (III) until being relegated to the 2. Amateurliga Nordbaden Mitte in 1970. Nowadays the club plays in the Kreisliga Karlsruhe.

References

External links
Official team site
Das deutsche Fußball-Archiv historical German domestic league tables 

Football clubs in Germany
Football clubs in Baden-Württemberg
Association football clubs established in 1906
1906 establishments in Germany